Sign of the Times is the ninth album by jazz keyboardist Bob James.

The title track has been sampled by De La Soul and Warren G.

Track listing

Personnel 
 Bob James – acoustic piano, Rhodes piano, all synthesizers, horn and string arrangements, rhythm track and synthesizer arrangements (3, 4, 6), calliope solo (5)
 Steve Khan – guitar (1-5)
 Bruce Dunlap – guitar (6)
 Eric Gale – guitar (6)
 Gary King – bass (1, 2, 5, 6)
 Marcus Miller – bass (3, 4)
 Major Holley – scat contrabass solo (5)
 John Robinson – drums (1, 2, 5)
 Rick Marotta – drums (3, 4)
 Buddy Williams – drums (6)
 Leonard "Doc" Gibbs – percussion (1-5)
 Ralph MacDonald – percussion (2)
 Airto Moreira – percussion (6)
 Tabby Andriello – special effects (5)
 Rod Temperton – rhythm track and synthesizer arrangements (1, 2, 5); horn, string and vocal arrangements

Brass and Woodwinds
 Jay Beckenstein – alto saxophone (3, 4)
 Grover Washington Jr. – tenor saxophone (6)
 Phil Bodner, Eddie Daniels, Wally Kane, George Marge and Whit Sidener – woodwinds
 Jim Pugh and Dave Taylor – trombone
 Jon Faddis, Mike Lawrence and Ron Tooley – trumpet

Strings
 Max Ellen, Barry Finclair, Charles Libove, Jan Mullen, David Nadien, Joseph Rabushka, Richard Sortomme and Gerald Tarack – violin

Vocals
 Patti Austin, Vivian Cherry, Kasey Cisyk, Babi Floyd, Milt Grayson, Hilary James, Yvonne Lewis and Luther Vandross

Production 
 Bob James – producer
 Joe Jorgensen – associate producer, recording, mixing 
 Nancy Byers – assistant engineer
 Marc Chusid – assistant engineer
 Chaz Clifton – assistant engineer
 Bruce Robbins – assistant engineer
 Don Wershba – assistant engineer
 Vlado Meller – mastering 
 Paula Scher – art direction, design 
 Bill King – photography

Studios
 Recorded at Mediasound, A&R Recording and CBS Recording Studios (New York City, NY); Minot Sound (White Plains, NY).
 Mixed and Mastered at CBS Recording Studios.

References 

Bob James (musician) albums
1981 albums
Albums produced by Bob James (musician)
CTI Records albums